France-Brésil et autres histoires  is a 2007 film.

Synopsis 
On July 1, 2006, during the Soccer World Cup, an illegal immigrant is detained and deported with his daughter, strongly contrasting with the glorification of a united and multicoloured France.

Awards 
 Film de Quartier de Dakar 2007

External links 

 

2007 films
2000s French films
French drama short films